Phyllocnistis spatulata is a moth of the family Gracillariidae, known from Assam, India. The hostplant for the species is Lindera caudata.

References

Phyllocnistis
Endemic fauna of India
Moths of Asia